Dennis van Valkenburgh (born August 16, 1944) is an American sprint canoer who competed in the mid-1960s. At the 1964 Summer Olympics in Tokyo, he finished eighth in the C-1 1000 m event.

References
Sports-reference.com profile

1944 births
American male canoeists
Canoeists at the 1964 Summer Olympics
Living people
Olympic canoeists of the United States
People from El Paso, Texas